The 2015 Knoxville Challenger was a professional tennis tournament played on indoor hard courts. It was the twelfth edition of the tournament which was part of the 2015 ATP Challenger Tour. It took place in Knoxville, United States between 8 and 15 November 2015.

Singles main-draw entrants

Seeds

 1 Rankings are as of November 2, 2015.

Other entrants
The following players received wildcards into the singles main draw:
  Stefan Kozlov
  Mackenzie McDonald
  Hunter Reese
  Luis Valero

The following players received entry into the singles main draw as special exempts:
  Tommy Paul
  Noah Rubin

The following players received entry from the qualifying draw:
  Sekou Bangoura 
  Adrien Bossel 
  Eric Quigley 
  Daniel Smethurst

Champions

Singles

 Daniel Evans def.  Frances Tiafoe 5–7, 6–1, 6–3

Doubles

 Johan Brunström /  Frederik Nielsen def.  Sekou Bangoura /  Matt Seeberger 6–1, 6–2

External links
Official Website

Knoxville Challenger
Knoxville Challenger
Knoxville
2015 in sports in Tennessee